Footprints is the debut studio album by Australian singer Holly Valance. It was released by London Records on 14 October 2002 in the United Kingdom. Valance worked with a variety of producers on the album, including Cutfather & Joe, Julian Gallagher, Jem Godfrey, Nellee Hooper, Bill Padley, Richard Stannard, and Phil Thornalley.

The album was a success in the United Kingdom, where the first single "Kiss Kiss" reached the top position on the singles chart. Footprints peaked at number nine on the UK Albums Chart, selling over 100,000 copies and being certified Gold. In Valance's home country of Australia, success was similar. Footprints reached the top fifteen, sold over 35,000 copies, and was later certified Gold. All three of its singles also reached the top 3 on the singles chart. Footprints was also successful in Japan, where the album reached number nineteen on the Oricon albums chart and sold 159,606 copies. It was later certified Gold.

Critical reception

Allmusic rated the album three and a half stars out of five. Caroline Sullivan from The Guardian found that Valance's "Kylie impersonation lacks the self-deprecating charm of the original, without which this "project" feels like an ambitious soap starlet chancing her arm. Despite producer Nellee Hooper affixing a bit of acoustic gravitas to the likes of "Down Boy," Footprints quickly comes up against Valance's breathy mediocrity. That said, the burbling "Naughty Girl" makes it clear that Valance's primary purpose is to disturb impressionable men, making the album a triumph in that respect."

Singles
"Kiss Kiss" was the first single released by Valance. The single was released in April 2002 and went straight to No. 1 on the UK and Australian charts. 

"Down Boy" was the second single. 

"Naughty Girl" was the third and final single from the album, becoming a Top 3 hit in Australia and Top 20 single in the UK. A fourth and final single, "Tuck Your Shirt In", was scheduled for release in the UK on 10 March 2003; however, the single was cancelled.

Track listing

Notes
 signifies additional producer

Personnel

Josh Abrahams – vocal producer, vocal recording
James Banbury – programming
Joe Belmaati – keyboards, programming
Yak Bondy – programming
Helen Boulding – background vocals
Paul Brady – mixing assistant
Pete Craigie – mixing
Rob Davis – guitar
Matthew Donaldson – photography
Niklas Flyckt – mixing
Marc Fox – percussion
Julian Gallagher – programming, multi instruments, producer
Jem Godfrey – arranger, programming, multi instruments, producer, mixing
Nellee Hooper – producer, mixing
Mark Jaimes – guitar
Henrik Jonback – guitar
Anders Kallmark – producer
Katrina Leskanich – background vocals
David Munday – guitar, keyboards
Sharon Murphy – background vocals
Jonas Ostman – mixing assistant
Bill Padley – arranger, programming, multi instruments, producer, mixing
Martin Phillipps – keyboards, programming
Karen Ann Poole – background vocals
Johnny Rockstar – beats
Ian Rossiter – assistant engineer
Richard Stannard – drums, producer, beatboxing
Fredro Starr – arranger, keyboards, producer
Alvin Sweeney – programming, engineer, mixing
Phil Thornalley – guitar, producer
Justin Tresidder – vocal producer
Steve Welton-Jaimes – producer
Nina Woodford – background vocals

Charts

Weekly charts

Year-end charts

Certifications

References

2002 debut albums
London Records albums
Holly Valance albums
Albums produced by Nellee Hooper